Leo Kelvin Hillis (12 January 1920 – 31 October 2007) was an Australian rules footballer who played with Footscray in the Victorian Football League (VFL). 		

After his football career, Hillis enlisted in the Royal Australian Navy, initially serving as a radio electrician on a range of ships and rising through the ranks to the level of a RAN Commander at the point of his discharge in March 1970.

Notes

External links 

1920 births
2007 deaths
Australian rules footballers from Melbourne
Western Bulldogs players
People from the City of Whittlesea
Royal Australian Navy officers